Eulima bilineata is a species of sea snail, a marine gastropod mollusk in the family Eulimidae. The species is one of a number within the genus Eulima.

Description
The shell measures approximately 6 mm in length. Adult shells have a tall narrow conic outline, with up to 13 flat-sided whorls and a slightly cyrtoconoid profile. The sutures are very slight, paralleled internally and above by false sutures, the latter being often more conspicuous in live shells. The exterior of the shell is smooth, with very delicate growth lines that become visible through reflected light. The aperture is narrow, drop-shaped, and the outer lip arises tangentially to the last whorl between two brown spiral bands.

Distribution
This species occurs in the following locations:

 Belgian Exclusive Economic Zone
 Caribbean Sea
 Cuba
 European waters (ERMS scope)
 Greek Exclusive Economic Zone
 Irish Exclusive Economic Zone
 Mediterranean Sea
 Northern coasts of Norway
 North East Atlantic
 Portuguese Exclusive Economic Zone
 Spanish Exclusive Economic Zone
 United Kingdom Exclusive Economic Zone
 Western coasts of Norway
 Wimereux

Feeding type
 Parasitic

References

 Gofas, S.; Le Renard, J.; Bouchet, P. (2001). Mollusca. in: Costello, M.J. et al. (eds), European Register of Marine Species: a check-list of the marine species in Europe and a bibliography of guides to their identification. Patrimoines Naturels. 50: 180-213. 
 Warén A. (1983) An anatomical description of Eulima bilineata Alder with remarks on and a revision of Pyramidelloides Nevill (Mollusca, Prosobranchia, Eulimidae). Zoologica Scripta 12(4): 273-294.

External links
 To World Register of Marine Species
 Alder J. (1848). Catalogue of the Mollusca of Northumberland and Durham. Transactions of the Tyneside Naturalist's Field Club (1848): 97-209
 Census of Marine Life (2012). SYNDEEP: Towards a first global synthesis of biodiversity, biogeography and ecosystem function in the deep sea. Unpublished data (datasetID: 38)

bilineata
Gastropods described in 1848